Serg Bell (born Sergey Mikhaylovich Belousov, 2 August 1971, Leningrad, Russian SFSR, Soviet Union) is a Singaporean businessman entrepreneur, investor and speaker, the founder and chairman of the board of Schaffhausen Institute of Technology and multiple global IT companies, including Acronis, a global data protection company, and is the senior founding partner of Runa Capital, a technology investment firm. He is also executive chairman of the board and chief architect of Parallels, Inc., a virtualization technology company, co-founder and chairman of the board of Acumatica, an enterprise resource planning software (ERP) company, and co-founder of QWave Capital. 

His employees have filed more than 350 U.S. patents for him and an h-index of 40.

In 2021 he officially changed his name to Serg Bell.

Early life and education
Bell was born in 1971 in Leningrad and studied at 45th Physics-Mathematics School. Bell later attended the Moscow Institute of Physics and Technology, graduating in 1992 with a bachelor's degree in physics. He received his master's degree in physics and electrical engineering in 1995, and a PhD in computer science in 2007. Bell came to Singapore in 1994 and became a Singaporean citizen in 2001.

Career
While earning his master's, Bell co-founded his first business, Unium (Phystech College), which provided science students with course materials. In 1992, he began working at a Russian computer company called Sunrise. Bell expanded the company's operations to 10 subsidiaries, becoming one of the largest PC retailers in Russia by the time he left in 1994. After leaving Sunrise, Bell founded and co-owned t Solomon Software SEA.  Solomon Software SEA was a distributor and developer arm of mid-market  ERP vendor Solomon Software in South-East Asia. Solomon Software was later acquired by Microsoft and is now known as Microsoft Dynamics SL.

In 2000, Bell founded SWsoft, a privately held server automation and virtualization software company and the then-parent company of Parallels, Inc. and Acronis Inc.
Bell‘s family office is located in Luxembourg as Arici Lux Sarl.

Acronis
In 2001, Bell founded Acronis as a storage management business unit of SWsoft. In 2003, Acronis was re-organized as a separate entity focused on backup and data protection software. In 2022 Acronis employs over 2,000 people worldwide, and its products are available in 26 languages in over 150 countries.

Bell has served on the board of directors since 2002. From 2007 to 2011, he turned his focus on Parallels, acting as CEO of the company. During this time he also founded a pair of venture capital funds, Runa Capital and QWave Capital. He returned as CEO of Acronis in May 2013, replacing former CEO Alex Pinchev.

Chief Constructor & Founder & Executive Board Member of Acronis, SB previously served as Acronis’ Chief Executive Officer from 2013-2021. As of July 1, 2021, SB has stepped down as CEO of Acronis to focus on the company’s technology and research strategy as Chief Research Officer.

Parallels, Inc.
Parallels, Inc. was initially a server automation and virtualization software unit of SWsoft before it was spun off into as a separate entity and maintained its own distinct branding. In December 2007, SWsoft announced its plans to change its name to Parallels and ship both companies' products under the Parallels name. The merger was formalized in January 2008. From 2007 to 2013, Bell led the company as CEO, while remaining on the board of directors at Acronis.

Bell stepped down as CEO and serves as the executive chairman of the board and chief architect of Parallels, Inc. The company has more than 900 employees across offices in North America, Europe, Australia and Asia and as of 2012 it had 5,000 customers and partners worldwide. Odin Automation, a service automation platform company owned by Parallels and founded by Beloussov, was sold to Ingram Micro in December 2015.

Runa Capital
In August 2010, Bell co-founded Runa Capital. The $135 million technology venture capital firm that was created "to seek growth opportunities in the rapidly growing areas of the tech sector, with specific focus on cloud computing and other hosted services, virtualization and mobile applications." Since 2010, Runa Capital has invested in over 30 companies with a combined $10 billion in assets. Runa Capital's largest investment was a $10 million Series C funding round of Acumatica on November 18, 2013. The round was led together with Almaz Capital.

Constructor group, formerly known as Schaffhausen Institute of Technology 
Bell founded Schaffhausen Institute of Technology in 2019 in Switzerland. Schaffhausen Institute of Technology is an international research-led university for selected areas in computer science, physics, and technology transformation.
Due to slow development in Switzerland and for expansion of the market, Bell invested in private Jacobs university in Bremen, Germany, becoming its major shareholder.

Other ventures
Bell is a co-founder and chairman of the board at Acumatica, a global cloud ERP company founded in 2007 with offices in Moscow, Singapore and Washington D.C.

In 2012, Bell co-founded QWave Capital. The company's headquarter is in Boston. QWave Capital has over $300 million in funds and has invested in four quantum technology companies: ID Quantique, Nano Meta Technologies, Clifton and Centrice.

Between 2012 and 2017, Bellv sat on the Governing Board of the Centre for Quantum Technologies. The Singapore-based research institute is a Research Centre of Excellence hosted by the National University of Singapore. The Centre brings together quantum physicists and computer scientists to explore the quantum nature of reality and the fundamental limits of information processing.

In 2021, he contributed to funding a new quantum computer startup company, QuEra, which is developing a 256-qubit machine.

See also
 Acronis
 Parallels, Inc.
 Runa Capital
 Acumatica

References

1971 births
Living people
Moscow Institute of Physics and Technology alumni